Always and Ever is a 2013 Hong Kong TVB television romance drama serial starring Bobby Au-yeung and Esther Kwan and produced by Chong Wai-kin.

The drama follows a love story which spans three lifetimes, from Song dynasty in the 13th century (Ep 1–13) to Hong Kong in the 1950s (Ep 13–30) and to modern Hong Kong (modern era, Ep 1, 30–31). It is the first on-screen pairing of Au-yeung and Kwan in ten years,  with Kwan not frequently acting due to the personal implication of taking care of her daughter.

Plot Overview
During an operation, CIB senior inspector, Circle Yuen (Bobby Au Yeung) accidentally kills his girlfriend, Phoenix Yeung (Esther Kwan).  In his remorse, he finds himself mysteriously sent back in time to the Song dynasty, where he is known as the imperial official Bao Zheng.  He meets Han Sheung-Sheung (Esther Kwan), who looks exactly like Phoenix; despite Sheung-Sheung's reservations, they fall in love and agree to marry.  However, Sheung-Sheung's childhood friend and adoptive brother, Ko Yiu-On (Ben Wong), out of ambition and jealousy that Sheung-Sheung refuses to marry him, forces her into casting a curse upon herself that she will always be killed by the man she loves.  Soon afterward, Yiu-On orchestrates a situation where Bao Zheng is forced into executing Sheung-Sheung.

When time shifts into the 1950s, Circle becomes Chinese Inspector Wah Lung-Piew and meets Tin Chau-Fung (Esther Kwan), the leader of a triad group who resembles Sheung-Sheung and Phoenix.  However, their relationship inhibited by the fact that Chau-Fung mistakenly believes the inspector as her husband's murderer and has ordered a citywide chase for his head.  While desperately trying to prove his innocence as Lung-Piew, he meets Lam Yim-Fong (Rebecca Zhu) and Yuen Kwai (Pierre Ngo), who will become Circle's parents, but is dismayed to find Yim-Fong falling in love with him as he tries to learn why his mother abruptly left his family.  When fate intervenes and Lung-Piew accidentally kills Chau-Fung again, the cycle of her curse is finally broken and Circle returns to modern day Hong Kong where he is given a second chance to change his and Phoenix's fates.

Cast
Note: the names of most Song Chinese characters are transliterated by TVB according to their Cantonese Chinese pronunciation; the Mandarin Chinese pronunciation of those characters' names are provided in brackets for reference if it differs from the transliteration based on Cantonese Chinese pronunciation

Main Characters
 Bobby Au-yeung as Justice Pao Cheng (13th century); Wah Long-Biu, a Chinese inspector (1950s); Circle Yuen, a police senior inspector from CIB (modern era)
 Esther Kwan as Hon Seung-Seung (Han Shang-shang), a talented scholar (13th century); Tin Chau-Fung, a popular triad leader (1950s); Phoenix Yeung, a reporter (modern era)

13th century
 Ben Wong as Ko Kai-On (Kao Chi-an), Sheung-Sheung's childhood friend (13th century)
 Ram Chiang as Advisor Gongsun (Kung-sun), a famed political advisor for Justice Pao (13th century)
 Benjamin Yuen as Chin Chiu (Chan Chao), a royal guard (13th century)
 Christine Kuo as Princess Hing Sau (Princess Ching-shou) (13th century)
 JJ Jia as Consort Yin (13th century)
 Vivien Yeo as Consort Suk (Consort Shu) (13th century)

1950s
 Mandy Wong as Tin Chau-Ngan, an exotic dancer who becomes a police officer in order to kill her sister Chau-Fung (1950s)
 Pierre Ngo Ka-nin as Yuen Kwai, a police officer and radio broadcaster who becomes Circle's father (1950s, retired in modern era) 
 Rebecca Zhu as Lam Yim-Fong, an exotic dancer who eventually becomes Circle's mother (1950s) 
 Derek Kok as Cho Pao (1950s)
 Sammy Sum as Lau Chuen, a police officer (1950s)

Viewership ratings

External links
 K-TVB.net English Synopsis

References

TVB dramas
Television series set in the Northern Song
Television series set in the 1950s
Television series set in the 2010s
2013 Hong Kong television series debuts
2013 Hong Kong television series endings
Hong Kong time travel television series
Fictional depictions of Bao Zheng in television